Capaldo may refer to:
Capaldo, Kansas
Capaldo (surname)